Plastic House on Base of Sky is the eighth studio album by American avant-garde metal band Kayo Dot. It was released on June 24, 2016 via The Flenser.

Critical reception
Tiny Mix Tapes called Plastic House on Base of Sky a "fundamentally disorienting, perplexing, and haunting album." The Quietus wrote that "beneath the album’s saccharin exterior, complex structures and timbre variations soar and meld."

Track listing
Music by Toby Driver. Lyrics by Jason Byron except "Brittle Urchin" by Toby Driver.

Credits
 Toby Driver - voice, synths, guitar, bass guitar
 Keith Abrams - drums
 Ron Varod - guitar on "Brittle Urchin"
 Daniel Means - saxophone
 Sage Riesman - violin
 Stacey Winegyn - violin
 Bing Minz - violin
 Roman Celine - viola
 Dabe Wyche - viola
 Alexis Travelion - cello
 Landen Chelengs - contrabass
 Lemuel Bardor - harpsichord
 Bree Eng - pipe organ
 Duggan Elston - hammond organ
 Valentin Dublev - mellotron
 Charmane Tressel - glass harmonica
 Gloria Hattifer - celesta
 Bhin Turmes - trumpet
 Ephraim Narata - flugelhorn
 George Chamdles - rhodes
 Stelvio Nebulli - hand percussion
 Guillaume Veltaj - hand percussion

References

2016 albums
Kayo Dot albums
The Flenser albums